The FFSA French Rally Championship or Championnat de France des Rallyes is France's leading domestic motor rally competition. It's a championship that has been won three times by Didier Auriol, Guy Fréquelin, Patrick Bernadini and Philippe Bugalski. Reflecting the highly developed nature of France, for the past 20 years the championship has been a tarmac championship, unlike the bulk of rally championships which are off-road or mixed surface events.

Champions
Sourced from:

References

External links
Series Official Web Site

Rally racing series
Motorsport competitions in France
Rally